Podreber is a settlement in the Municipality of Semič in southeastern Slovenia. The area is part of the traditional region of Lower Carniola and is now included in the Southeast Slovenia Statistical Region.

References

External links

Podreber at Geopedia

Populated places in the Municipality of Semič